Unna ja Nuuk is a Finnish family film that debuted in Finland on 20 January 2006. Directed by Saara Cantell, its screenplay was written by Joona Tena and Sami Keski-Vähälä. Unna ja Nuuk stars Rosa Salomaa, Toni Leppe, Esko Salminen, Meri Nenonen, Jenni Banerjee, Tommi Korpela, etc. Much of the film's dialogue is written in a version of the Proto-Finnic language, which was reconstructed by lector Jouko Koivisto.

The movie had a budget of approximately €1.3 million and was produced by Mandart Entertainment Ltd. The movie featured in the Berlin Film Festival in February 2006.

Film festivals

Awards
In 2006, Unna ja Nuuk received a 2nd place category award at the Giffoni Film Festival in Italy.

References

External links
 

2006 films
Finnish fantasy films
2006 fantasy films
2000s Finnish-language films